Wilfrid la Rive Rive Bourchier (22 March 1884 – 7 September 1973) was an Irish cricketer. He made his debut for Ireland against Philadelphia in August 1908, and went on to play for them on four occasions, the last coming against Scotland in July 1909. Three of his four matches had first-class status.

References
CricketEurope Stats Zone profile

1884 births
1973 deaths
Irish cricketers
Sportspeople from County Tipperary